INS Sunayna is the second  of the Indian Navy, designed and constructed indigenously by the Goa Shipyard Limited. It is designed to undertake fleet support operations, coastal and offshore patrolling, ocean surveillance and monitoring of sea lines of communications and offshore assets and escort duties.

Service history
The keel laying of the ship was done on 25 September 2007, it was launched on 14 November 2009, was delivered to the navy for sea trials on 3 September 2013, and got commissioned into active service on 15 October 2013 at Kochi, her home port.

She will be deployed for anti-piracy operations in the Gulf of Aden.

In June 2018 she was deployed to Yemen's Socotra island as part of "Operation Nistar", an HADR mission to evacuate around 38 stranded Indian nationals in/around Socotra, after a cyclone hit the area.

INS Sunaya, along with INS Chennai was sent to the Persian Gulf and Gulf of Oman in June 2019 to protect Indian shipping interests amid tensions in the Strait of Hormuz.

See also

References

External links

Patrol vessels of the Indian Navy
2009 ships
Ships built in India